The Elifba alphabet (from ) was the main writing system for the Albanian language during the time of the Ottoman Empire from 14th century to 1911. This Albanian variant of the Abjad Ottoman was used to write the Albanian language. The last version of the Elifbaja shqip was invented by the rilindas, Rexhep Voka (1847-1917).

History 

The Ottoman Turkish alphabet was mainly favored by Albanian Muslims, but also used by some Christians. After being especially used during the Bejte poetry, a primer for the Albanian language in Arabic script was published in 1861 in Constantinople by Mullah Daut Boriçi, a prominent member of the League of Prizren.

During 1909 and 1910 there were movements by Albanian Young Turks supporters to adopt the Arabic alphabet, as they considered the Latin script to be un-Islamic. In Elbasan, Muslim clerics led a demonstration for the Arabic script, telling their congregations that using the Latin script would make them infidels. In 1911, the Young Turks dropped their opposition to the Latin alphabet, and the current Latin alphabet for Albanian was adopted. In order to eliminate ambiguity in the pronunciation of the Arabic script, Rexhep Voka developed a customized Arabic alphabet consisting of 44 consonants and vowels, which he published in 1911. However, it was hardly used anymore due to the Congress of Manastir. Tiranli Fazli then used this script to publish a thirty-two page grammar. Only one Albanian newspaper at the time ever appeared in Arabic script, and it lasted a brief period. Regardless of what script appeared, such material raised Albanian national consciousness.

References

Ottoman Albania
Writing systems
Albanian scripts
Arabic alphabets